Emily V. Gordon (born May 3, 1979) is an American writer, producer and podcast host. She co-wrote the 2017 romantic comedy film The Big Sick, based on her relationship with her husband and frequent collaborator, comic Kumail Nanjiani. Gordon and Nanjiani won an Independent Spirit Award for Best First Screenplay for The Big Sick; they were also nominated for the Academy Award for Best Original Screenplay, among many other nominations.

Gordon began her career as a family and couples therapist before becoming a writer and comedy producer. She co-created the live show The Meltdown with Jonah and Kumail and its television counterpart for Comedy Central, and has written for television (The Carmichael Show), a book (Super You), and for several online and print publications.

Early life
Gordon was born and raised in Winston-Salem, North Carolina. She received a BA in psychology from the East Carolina University and an MS/EdS in couples and family counseling from the University of North Carolina at Greensboro.

Career

Counseling career
Gordon was a practicing therapist from 2004 to 2009, working in North Carolina, Chicago, Illinois (where she moved in 2005) and Brooklyn, New York (where she moved in 2007).

Writing and comedy
Gordon began her comedy career in New York, where she worked at Comix comedy club and produced a live show with Pete Holmes. By the time she moved to Los Angeles in 2010, Gordon was pursuing comedy and freelance writing full-time.

Gordon has written two webseries aimed at teenagers, called Power Up and ExploreD, at Disney.com. She wrote for the second season of The Carmichael Show on NBC, writing an episode called "New Neighbors". In addition to writing, Gordon also produces comedy. In 2010, she created a weekly live show co-hosted by Jonah Ray and Kumail Nanjiani called The Meltdown with Jonah and Kumail, located in the back of comic bookstore Meltdown Comics; Gordon served as producer and booker. In 2011, she was asked by Chris Hardwick, who wanted to turn the space into a curated comedy venue, to act as program director. She served as program director of the Nerdist Showroom at Meltdown Comics from 2011 to 2012. In 2013, Comedy Central ordered a pilot for The Meltdown with Jonah and Kumail, which was made a series in 2014; Gordon was an executive producer.

From 2011 to 2015, Gordon and Nanjiani co-hosted a Nerdist network podcast called The Indoor Kids, which "isn't just about video games, but it isn't not about video games." In 2020, Gordon and Nanjiani co-hosted a podcast called Staying In with Emily and Kumail, about the quarantine due to COVID-19.

Gordon was signed to adapt Cynthia D’Aprix Sweeney's 2016 novel The Nest for Amazon's film studio. Joey Soloway and Andrea Sperling will produce the feature film.

Super You
Gordon's first book, Super You: Release Your Inner Superhero, a tongue-in-cheek self-improvement guide, was released in 2015.

The Big Sick

Gordon also co-wrote the screenplay of and co-executive produced the 2017 film The Big Sick, with her husband Kumail Nanjiani. The critically acclaimed film is based on the beginning of their relationship, with Nanjiani playing himself, and Gordon (renamed Emily Gardner) played by Zoe Kazan. The Big Sick was directed by Michael Showalter and produced by Judd Apatow.

Gordon and Nanjiani's script won the Independent Spirit Award for Best First Screenplay. It was also nominated for a 2018 Academy Award for Best Original Screenplay, as well as screenwriting awards from the Writers Guild of America, the Gotham Awards, and a dozen critics' associations.

Personal life
Gordon has been married to actor and comedian Kumail Nanjiani since 2007. It is her second marriage. She met Nanjiani at a comedy show in Chicago where he was performing and she lightly heckled him, an encounter depicted in The Big Sick. In the ensuing months, they began dating but Gordon fell seriously ill and was put into a medically induced coma before being diagnosed with Still's disease. Gordon recovered and three months later—a year after meeting—they married.  They previously lived in Chicago and New York  but later moved to Los Angeles.

Filmography
Selected credits

Awards and nominations

Notes

References

External links

1979 births
American comedy writers
American television writers
American women screenwriters
Living people
University of North Carolina at Greensboro alumni
American women television writers
Writers from Winston-Salem, North Carolina
Independent Spirit Award winners
Screenwriters from North Carolina
21st-century American women writers
21st-century American screenwriters